Bryang William Kayo (born July 27, 2002) is an American soccer player who plays as a midfielder for German club 1. FC Nürnberg II, on loan from VfL Wolfsburg II.

Early years 
Kayo is originally from Maryland, and is of Cameroonian descent. He played youth soccer for Bethesda SC U-14s.

Professional

USL Championship
Kayo joined D.C. United's academy system. Kayo made three appearances for Loudoun United, the reserve team of D.C. United before leaving the club.  On September 9, 2019, Kayo signed with the senior team of fellow USL Championship side Orange County SC. Kayo made the bench five times for Orange County SC during the 2019 season, however, he never made his senior team debut.

VfL Wolfsburg 
On July 13, 2020, it was announced that Kayo, along with fellow United States youth national teamer Kobe Hernandez-Foster, signed with VfL Wolfsburg of the German Bundesliga. It was announced that Kayo would begin playing with the team's reserve side, VfL Wolfsburg II.

Loan to Viktoria Berlin
On July 30, 2021, Kayo was loaned to newly promoted 3. Liga side Viktoria Berlin.

Loan to Nürnberg II
On January 31, 2022, Kayo moved on loan to 1. FC Nürnberg II.

Career statistics

References

2002 births
Living people
People from Montgomery Village, Maryland
American people of Cameroonian descent
Sportspeople from Montgomery County, Maryland
American soccer players
Soccer players from Maryland
Association football midfielders
United States men's youth international soccer players
USL Championship players
Regionalliga players
3. Liga players
Loudoun United FC players
Orange County SC players
VfL Wolfsburg II players
FC Viktoria 1889 Berlin players
1. FC Nürnberg II players
American expatriate soccer players
American expatriate soccer players in Germany